Gabrielle Dee Giffords (born June 8, 1970) is an American retired politician and gun control advocate who served as a member of the United States House of Representatives representing  from January 2007 until January 2012, when she resigned due to a severe brain injury suffered during an assassination attempt. A member of the Democratic Party, she was the third woman in Arizona's history to be elected to the U.S. Congress.

Born and raised in Tucson, Arizona, Giffords graduated from Scripps College and Cornell University. After initially moving to New York City, where she worked in regional economic development for Price Waterhouse, she returned to Arizona to work as the CEO of El Campo Tire Warehouses, a family business started by her grandfather. She served in the Arizona House of Representatives from 2001 until 2003 and the Arizona Senate from 2003 until 2005 when she was elected to the U.S. House. She had just begun her third term in January 2011 when she was shot in the head in an assassination attempt and mass shooting just outside of Tucson during an event with constituents. Giffords has since recovered much of her ability to walk, speak, read, and write. She was greeted by a standing ovation upon her return to the House floor in August 2011. She attended President Obama's State of the Union address on January 24, 2012, and appeared on the floor of the House the following day, at which time she formally submitted her resignation, receiving a standing ovation and accolades from her colleagues and the leadership of the House.

Though a moderate on the issue during her time in Congress, Giffords has since become an ardent advocate for gun control. In January 2013, she and her husband launched Americans for Responsible Solutions, a non-profit organization and Super-PAC which later joined with the Law Center to Prevent Gun Violence to become Giffords. She is married to former Space Shuttle Commander Mark Kelly, a United States senator from Arizona.

Early life
Gabrielle Dee Giffords was born in and grew up in Tucson, Arizona; her parents were Gloria Kay (née Fraser) and Spencer J. Giffords. She was raised in a mixed religious environment, as her mother was a Christian Scientist and her father was Jewish. Her paternal grandfather, Akiba Hornstein, was a Jewish emigrant from Lithuania who changed his name to Giffords to avoid anti-Semitism in the United States. Through her father, Giffords is a second cousin of actress Gwyneth Paltrow and director Jake Paltrow.

Giffords graduated from Tucson's University High School. She is a former Girl Scout. She received a Bachelor of Arts degree in Sociology and Latin American History from Scripps College in California in 1993; and spent a year as a Fulbright Scholar in Chihuahua, Mexico. She returned to graduate school, earning a Master's degree in Regional Planning from Cornell University in 1996. She focused her studies on Mexican-American relations.

Giffords worked as an associate for regional economic development at Price Waterhouse in New York City. In 1996, she became president and CEO of El Campo Tire Warehouses, a local chain of auto service centers founded by her grandfather. The business was sold to Goodyear Tire in 2000. At the time of the sale, she commented on the difficulties local businesses face when competing against large national firms.

Since 2001, she has practiced Judaism exclusively and belongs to Congregation Chaverim, a Reform synagogue, in Tucson.

Arizona legislature

Elections
Giffords switched her party affiliation from Republican to Democratic in 2000 and was elected to the Arizona House of Representatives in 2001. She was elected to the Arizona Senate in the fall of 2002, at the time the youngest woman elected to that body. She took office in January 2003 and was re-elected in 2004. She resigned from the Arizona Senate on December 1, 2005, in preparation for her congressional campaign.

Tenure
In early 2005, Giffords observed that "the 2004 election took its toll on our bipartisan coalition" and that as a result "a number of significant problems will receive far less attention than they deserve." She highlighted among these, the lack of high-paying jobs or necessary infrastructure, rapid growth, and inward migration that threatened the environment and "strain[ed] ... education, health care, and transportation", and unresolved problems such as Students First; Arnold v. Sarn; repayments due under Ladewig v. Arizona; the No Child Left Behind mandate; low educational achievement; health care costs; and the demands of the Arizona Health Care Cost Containment System. She said that Arizona was not alone in facing such challenges.

Expanding health care access was an issue pursued by Giffords when she served in the legislature. She also pushed for bills related to mental health and was named by the Mental Health Association of Arizona as the 2004 Legislator of the Year. Giffords earned the Sierra Club's Most Valuable Player award.

In the legislature, Giffords worked on the bipartisan Children's Caucus, which sought to improve education and health care for Arizona's children. Critics of this plan argued that it amounted to taxpayer-funded daycare. She worked with Arizona Governor Janet Napolitano to promote all-day kindergarten. Giffords supported raising more money for schools "through sponsorship of supplemental state aid through bonds and tax credits that could be used for school supplies." She was awarded Arizona Family Literacy's Outstanding Legislator for 2003.

U.S. House of Representatives

Elections
2006

Giffords launched her first candidacy for the U.S. Congress on January 24, 2006. The campaign received national attention early on as a likely pick-up for the Democratic Party. Prominent Democrats, including Tom Daschle, Robert Reich, Janet Napolitano, and Bill Clinton, endorsed her. EMILY's List endorsed Giffords early in the campaign cycle. The Sierra Club and the Arizona Education Association also endorsed her. On September 12, 2006, Giffords won her party's nomination in the primary election.

Her Republican opponent in the general election was Randy Graf, a conservative former state senator known for his enforcement-only position on immigration and illegal aliens. Graf had run against Jim Kolbe in the 2004 GOP primary and had announced his candidacy in 2006 before Kolbe announced his retirement. The Republican establishment was somewhat cool toward Graf, believing he might be too conservative for the district. The national GOP took the unusual step of endorsing one of the more moderate candidates in the primary. Graf won anyway, helped by a split in the Republican moderate vote between two candidates.

Not long after the primary, Congressional Quarterly changed its rating of the race to "Leans Democrat". By late September, the national GOP had pulled most of its funding, effectively conceding the seat to Giffords. Giffords won the race on November 7, 2006, with 54 percent of the vote. Graf received 42 percent. The rest of the vote went to minor candidates. Giffords' victory was portrayed as evidence that Americans are accepting towards comprehensive immigration reform. She was the first woman with a Jewish father elected to Congress from Arizona.

2008

In 2008, Giffords was elected to a second term. Republican Tim Bee, a childhood classmate and former colleague in the Arizona State Senate, ran against her. Bee was the President of the Arizona State Senate and considered a strong challenger in this race. Despite native son John McCain's running as the Republican presidential candidate, Giffords was reelected with 56.20 percent of the vote to Bee's 41.45 percent.

2010

On November 5, 2010, Giffords was declared the victor after a close race against Republican Jesse Kelly. Kelly, an Iraq War veteran (and not related to Mark Kelly), was listed as a top-ten Tea Party candidate to watch by Politico, and described by The Arizona Republic as highly conservative even compared to Sarah Palin. Giffords had been targeted for defeat by Sarah Palin's political action committee, SarahPAC.

Giffords participated in the reading of the United States Constitution on the floor of the House of Representatives on January 6, 2011; she read the First Amendment.

Tenure

Following the November 2006 election, Giffords was sworn in as a congresswoman on January 3, 2007. She was the third woman in Arizona's history to be elected to serve in the U.S. Congress. In her inaugural speech on the floor of the House of Representatives, Giffords advocated a comprehensive immigration reform package, including modern technology to secure the border, more border patrol agents, tough employer sanctions for businesses that knowingly hire illegal immigrants, and a guest-worker program. In her first month in office, Giffords voted in favor of increased federal funding for embryonic stem-cell research; raising the minimum wage; endorsing the 9/11 Commission recommendations; new rules for the House of Representatives targeting ethical issues; and the repeal of $14 billion of subsidies to big oil companies, in favor of renewable energy subsidies and the founding of the Strategic Renewable Energy Reserve.

During the 2007 session of Congress, Giffords introduced a bill (H.R. 1441) that forbids the sale of F-14 aircraft parts on the open market to prevent them from being acquired by Iran. Giffords advocated for a national day of recognition for cowboys as one of her first actions. She voted for the contentious May 2007 Iraq Emergency Supplemental Spending bill, saying, "I cannot, in good conscience, allow the military to run out of money while American servicemen and women are being attacked every day". She has also been a Girl Scout supporter for many years. On April 21, 2007, Giffords hosted her third "Congress on Your Corner" in Tucson, Arizona, and kicked things off by speaking to the Girl Scouts of Southern Arizona, Sahuaro Council.

Giffords was a member of the Blue Dog Coalition and the New Democrat Coalition. She was a co-founder of the Congressional Motorcycle Safety Caucus. Until her husband's retirement, she was the only member of the U.S. Congress whose spouse was an active duty member of the U.S. military. She is also known as a strong proponent of solar energy as well as for her work to secure the Mexico–United States border.

Committee assignments
 Committee on Armed Services
 Subcommittee on Tactical Air and Land Forces
 Subcommittee on Readiness
 Committee on Science, Space and Technology
 Subcommittee on Space and Aeronautics (Ranking Member)
 Subcommittee on Technology and Innovation

Attempted assassination

On January 8, 2011, Giffords was shot in the head outside a Safeway grocery store in Casas Adobes, Arizona, a suburban area northwest of Tucson, during her first "Congress on Your Corner" (a public opportunity for constituents to speak directly with their representatives) gathering of the year. A man ran up to the crowd and began firing a 9mm pistol with a 33-round magazine, hitting 19 people, and killing six, among them federal judge John Roll and 9-year-old child Christina-Taylor Green, who was the granddaughter of MLB baseball manager and GM Dallas Green. A 20th person was injured at the scene, but not by gunfire.

The shooter, Jared Lee Loughner, was detained by bystanders until he was taken into police custody. Federal officials charged Loughner on the next day with killing federal government employees, attempting to assassinate a member of Congress, and attempting to kill federal employees. After eventually facing more than 50 federal criminal charges, Loughner pleaded guilty to 19 of them in a plea bargain to avoid a death sentence.

Giffords' intern, Daniel Hernández Jr., provided first-aid assistance to her immediately after she was wounded, and is credited with saving her life. She was quickly evacuated to the University Medical Center of Tucson in critical condition, though she was still conscious and "following commands" at the time.

On the same day doctors performed emergency surgery to extract skull fragments and a small amount of necrotic tissue from her brain. The bullet passed through Giffords' head without crossing the midline of the brain, where the most critical injuries typically result. Part of her skull was removed to avoid further damage to the brain from pressure caused by swelling. Doctors who first treated Giffords said the bullet entered the back of her head and exited through the front of her skull, but physicians later concluded that it had traveled in the opposite direction.

Upon receiving a call from a staffer about Giffords' injury, husband Mark Kelly and his daughters flew in a friend's aircraft directly from Houston to Tucson.

Recovery
Giffords initially was placed in an induced coma to allow her brain to rest. She was able to respond to simple commands when periodically awakened, but was unable to speak as she was on a ventilator. Nancy Pelosi said Giffords' husband Mark Kelly acknowledged that there is a "rough road ahead" for his wife's recovery, but was encouraged by her responsiveness, which included the ability to signal with her hand and move both arms. U.S. Army neurologist Geoffrey Ling of the Uniformed Services University in Bethesda, Maryland, was sent to Tucson to consult on Giffords' condition. Ling stated, "Her prognosis for maintaining the function that she has is very good. It's over 50 percent." On January 11, neurosurgeon G. Michael Lemole Jr. said that Giffords' sedation had been reduced and that she could breathe on her own. On January 12, President Barack Obama visited Giffords at the medical center and publicly stated in an evening memorial ceremony that she had "opened her eyes for the first time" that day. Shortly after the shootings, some questions were raised by the media as to whether Giffords could be removed from office under a state law that allows a public office to be declared vacant if the officeholder is absent for three months, but a spokesperson for the Arizona secretary of state said the statute "doesn't apply to federal offices" and was, therefore, not relevant.

As Giffords' status improved, by mid-January she began simple physical therapy, including sitting up with the assistance of hospital staff and moving her legs upon command. On January 15, surgeons performed a tracheotomy, replacing the ventilator tube with a smaller one inserted through Giffords' throat to assist independent breathing. Ophthalmologist Lynn Polonski surgically repaired Giffords' damaged eye socket, with additional reconstructive surgery to follow. Giffords' condition improved from "critical" to "serious" on January 17, and to "good" on January 25. She was transferred on January 21 to the Memorial Hermann Medical Center in Houston, Texas, where she subsequently moved to the TIRR Memorial Hermann to undergo a program of physical therapy, occupational therapy and speech therapy. Medical experts' initial assessment in January was that Giffords' recovery could take from several months to more than one year. Upon her arrival in Houston, her doctors were optimistic, saying she has "great rehabilitation potential".

On March 12, 2011, Giffords' husband informed her that six other people had been killed in the attack on her, but he did not identify who they were until months later. In late April, Giffords' doctors reported that her physical, cognitive, and language production abilities had improved significantly, placing her in the top 5 percent of patients recovering from similar injuries. She was walking under supervision with perfect control of her left arm and leg, and able to write with her left hand. She was able to read and understand, and spoke in short phrases. With longer efforts, she was able to produce more complex sentences.

From early in her recovery, Giffords' husband had expressed confidence that she would be able to travel to the Kennedy Space Center, Florida, to witness the launch of his final Space Shuttle mission, STS-134, which was scheduled for April 2011. On April 25, Giffords' doctors cleared her for travel to Florida for the launch, scheduled for April 29. She went to Florida to watch from a private family area with no public appearance or photography. The launch of STS-134 was delayed due to mechanical problems, and Giffords and Kelly returned to Houston after meeting with President Obama, who had also planned to see the launch with his family at Kennedy Space Center (KSC).

After continuing her rehabilitation therapy in Houston, Giffords returned to KSC for her husband's launch on May 16, 2011. Kelly wore his wife's wedding ring into space, which she had exchanged for his.

Giffords underwent cranioplasty surgery on May 18, 2011, to replace the part of her skull that had been removed in January to permit her brain to swell after the gunshot to her head. Surgeons replaced the bone with a piece of molded hard plastic, fixed with tiny screws. They expected that her skull would eventually fuse with the porous plastic. From that point, Giffords no longer needed to wear the helmet that she had been wearing to protect her brain from further injury. On June 9, 2011, her aide Pia Carusone announced that while Giffords' comprehension appeared to be "close to normal, if not normal", she was not yet using complete sentences. On June 12, two photos of Giffords taken on May 17 were released, the first since the shooting. On June 15, Giffords was released from the hospital to return home, where she continued speech, music, physical and occupational therapy. Having learned the French horn as a child, she picked it up again as part of her music therapy and in August 2020 spoke about that experience in a speech endorsing Joe Biden's presidential bid.

On August 1, 2011, she made her return to the House floor to vote in favor of raising the debt limit ceiling. She was met with a standing ovation and accolades from her fellow members of Congress. A Giffords spokesman, Mark Kimble, stated in August 2011 that the congresswoman was walking without a cane and was writing left-handed, as she did not have full use of her right side. On October 6, Giffords traveled to Washington for her husband's retirement ceremony, where she presented him with the Distinguished Flying Cross medal. She returned to her husband's Texas home. On October 25, 2011, she travelled to Asheville, North Carolina, for intensive rehabilitation treatments, ending November 4. In Kelly's memoir, Gabby: A Story of Courage and Hope, released in November 2011, he reported that Giffords would return to Congress. , she continued to struggle with language and had lost fifty percent of her vision in both eyes.

Resignation from Congress

On January 22, 2012, Giffords announced in a video statement that she intended to resign her seat so that she could focus on her recovery. She attended President Obama's 2012 State of the Union Address on January 24, and formally submitted her resignation on January 25. Appearing on the floor of the House, after the last bill she sponsored was brought to a vote and unanimously passed, Giffords was lauded by members of Congress and the majority and minority leaders who spoke in tribute to her strength and accomplishment in an unusual farewell ceremony. Her letter of resignation was read on her behalf by her close friend and fellow Democratic representative, Debbie Wasserman Schultz.

Post-congressional activities

A joint memoir by Giffords and her husband, Gabby: A Story of Courage and Hope, with co-author Jeffrey Zaslow, was published on November 15, 2011. Giffords and Kelly were interviewed by ABC's Diane Sawyer in their first joint interview since the shooting, which aired on a special edition of 20/20 on November 14, 2011, in conjunction with the book's publication.

Giffords has made appearances at the three Democratic National Conventions held since she left congress. On September 6, 2012, Giffords led the Pledge of Allegiance at that evening's meeting of the 2012 Democratic National Convention. At the 2016 Democratic National Convention, Giffords delivered a speech in support of presidential nominee Hillary Clinton. For the 2020 Democratic National Convention, Giffords delivered a speech supporting presidential nominee Joe Biden and urging action on gun control.

After her shooting, Giffords became an advocate for anti-gun-violence causes. In 2013, shortly after the Sandy Hook Elementary School shooting, Giffords and her husband founded the nonprofit and super PAC Americans for Responsible Solutions (ARS) to support pro-gun control candidates. In 2017 the organization was reorganized, becoming Giffords.

In January 2013, Giffords still had difficulty speaking and walking, and her right arm was paralyzed. She continued to undergo speech and physical therapy.

On January 8, 2014, Giffords marked the third anniversary of the shooting by going skydiving. Giffords said on an interview with the Today show, "Oh, wonderful sky. Gorgeous mountain. Blue skies. I like a lot. A lot of fun. Peaceful, so peaceful."

The White House awarded Giffords the Presidential Medal of Freedom on July 7, 2022. She was the Grand Marshal of the 2023 Rose Parade and presided over the Rose Parade and the Rose Bowl game.

Personal life

Giffords married U.S. Navy captain and NASA astronaut Mark Kelly on November 10, 2007. Kelly was the Space Shuttle's pilot on the STS-108 and STS-121 missions, was the commander of STS-124 and STS-134, and became a U.S. Senator for Arizona in 2020.

Giffords is a former member of the Arizona regional board of the Anti-Defamation League. After Hurricane Katrina struck in August 2005, Giffords spent time as a volunteer in Houston, Texas, in relief efforts for hurricane victims. She wrote about her experience in the Tucson Citizen.

Giffords is an avid reader, and was featured on NPR's Weekend Edition on July 9, 2006, talking about her love of books. She was periodically interviewed in 2007 together with Illinois Republican Peter Roskam on NPR's All Things Considered. The series focused on their experiences as freshman members of the 110th Congress.

Political positions

Economy
Giffords voted against President Bush's Economic Stimulus Act of 2008. Giffords was one of 60 lawmakers who voted against the Emergency Economic Stabilization Act of 2008 during its first House vote before switching to a yes vote in its second House vote, and she voted for the American Recovery and Reinvestment Act of 2009.

In August 2011, she voted in favor of raising the debt ceiling.

Education
Giffords argues that Americans are competing on a global level and that this competition starts in the classroom. She is a critic of the No Child Left Behind law, viewing it as an unfunded federal mandate. She supports public schools and their improved efficiency.

Energy
Giffords strongly supports renewable energy, in particular solar energy, as a top public policy priority.

In September 2007, she published a report titled: The Community Solar Energy Initiative, Solar Energy in Southern Arizona, observing that Arizona has enough sunshine to power the entire United States. It reviews current energy usage and discusses how to increase the production of solar electricity. On August 1, 2008, she wrote to congressional leaders regarding tax credits that were set to expire, saying that failure to extend the scheme would be extremely harmful to the renewable energy industry "just as it is beginning to take off".

Immigration and border security

During Gifford's tenure in the House, Arizona's 8th Congressional District was one of ten in the country bordering Mexico. Giffords has stated that the Arizona SB 1070 legislation is a "clear calling that the federal government needs to do a better job" and says that she hopes the legislation acts as a wake-up call to the federal government. However, she stopped short of supporting the law itself, saying that it "does nothing to secure our border" and that it "stands in direct contradiction to our past and, as a result, threatens our future". She also claimed that SB1070 kept Arizona from attracting students and businesses.

On August 31, 2010, Giffords praised the arrival of National Guard troops on the border: "Arizonans have waited a long time for the deployment of the National Guard in our state. Their arrival represents a renewed national commitment to protecting our border communities from drug cartels and smugglers."

Giffords worked to secure passage of the August 2010 bill to fund more Border Patrol agents and surveillance technology for Arizona's border with Mexico. The legislation passed the House of Representatives only to be sent back by the U.S. Senate with reduced funding. Ultimately a $600-million bill was passed and signed into law. The bill was over $100 million less than Giffords fought for, but she said, "This funding signals a stronger federal commitment to protect those Americans who live and work near the border."

In 2008, Giffords introduced legislation that would have increased the cap on the H-1B visa from 65,000 per year to 130,000 per year. If that were not sufficient, according to her legislation, the cap would have been increased to 180,000 per year. The bill would have allowed, at most, 50% of employees at any given company with at least 50 employees to be H-1B guest workers. Giffords said the bill would help high-tech companies in southern Arizona, some of which rely on H-1B employees. However, Giffords' bill was never voted on by the House of Representatives.

Gun control
In 2008, before being shot, Giffords opposed Washington, D.C. prohibitions on possession of handguns in the home and having usable firearms there, signing an amicus brief with the U.S. Supreme Court to support its overturn.

In January 2013, Giffords and her husband Mark Kelly started a political action committee called Americans for Responsible Solutions whose mission is to promote gun-control legislation with elected officials and the general public. The couple supports "keeping guns out of the hands of dangerous people like criminals, terrorists, and the mentally ill".

Other proposals from Giffords and Kelly include limiting the sale of certain magazines, limiting the sale of assault weapons, and stopping gun trafficking.

Giffords was a surprise witness at a Senate Judiciary Committee hearing on gun violence on January 30, 2013. In a halting voice, she called for Congress to pass tougher laws on guns, saying "too many children are dying." Giffords is right-handed; her speech therapist had to write out her statement for her since her right arm was paralyzed in the shooting.

In 2017, after the Las Vegas shooting that killed 58 and injured 546, she implored lawmakers to take action, saying she "knows the horror of gun violence all too well".

In 2020 she spoke on the third night of the 2020 Democratic National Convention, urging action on gun control. She worked with a speech therapist for months in preparation for the speech, and also performed "America" on the French horn, an instrument she had played as a teen, as a symbol of her recovery.

Naming honors 

It was announced by Secretary of the Navy Ray Mabus, on February 10, 2012, that the next U.S. Navy littoral combat ship would be named . Giffords, still recovering from injuries sustained in the 2011 assassination attempt, attended the ship's keel-laying ceremony and etched her initials into a plate welded into the ship.

USS Gabrielle Giffords was christened at the Austal USA shipyard in Mobile, Alabama, on June 13, 2015. Giffords attended the christening ceremony, along with Second Lady of the United States Jill Biden, who served as the ship's sponsor. The ship was commissioned on June 12, 2017, at Port of Galveston, Texas.

A subsequent Navy report on the naming noted that Secretary Mabus considered honoring Giffords and other victims of the Tucson shooting by naming LCS-10 after the city of Tucson, consistent with current practice of naming littoral combat ships for U.S. cities, but this was not possible because , an active , currently bears the name.

Electoral history

See also
 Giffords
 Giffords Law Center to Prevent Gun Violence
 List of Jewish members of the United States Congress
 List of United States Congress members killed or wounded in office
 Women in the United States House of Representatives

References

External links

  official U.S. House website (archive 2011)
 
 
 Gabrielle Giffords for U.S. Congress official campaign website

 Profile at SourceWatch
 Giffords' announcement of her resignation, January 22, 2012
 giffords.org Giffords Law Center to Prevent Gun Violence and Giffords PAC
 Gabrielle Giffords   Video produced by Makers: Women Who Make America
 
 

|-

|-

|-

 
1970 births
2011 Tucson shooting
21st-century American politicians
21st-century American women politicians
21st-century American women writers
American gun control activists
21st-century American memoirists
American people of Lithuanian-Jewish descent
American people of Polish-Jewish descent
American Reform Jews
American shooting survivors
American women in business
Democratic Party Arizona state senators
Cornell University College of Architecture, Art, and Planning alumni
Democratic Party members of the United States House of Representatives from Arizona
Female members of the United States House of Representatives
Jewish members of the United States House of Representatives
Jewish women politicians
Harvard Kennedy School staff
Living people
Democratic Party members of the Arizona House of Representatives
Politicians from Tucson, Arizona
Scripps College alumni
American women memoirists
Women state legislators in Arizona
Writers from Tucson, Arizona
Spouses of Arizona politicians
Paltrow family
Presidential Medal of Freedom recipients
Fulbright alumni